The Devil-Doll (1936) is a horror film directed by Tod Browning and starring Lionel Barrymore and Maureen O'Sullivan. The film was adapted from the novel Burn Witch Burn! (1932) by Abraham Merritt. It has become a cult film.

A French scientist is worried about human overpopulation. He creates a formula able to shrink humans, in order for the planet's resources to last longer. He dies shortly after a prison escape, and his former cellmate decides to use the formula in a revenge scheme. The former prisoner targets the people who had originally framed him for bank robbery and murder.

Plot
Paul Lavond (Barrymore), who was wrongly convicted of robbing his own Paris bank and killing a night watchman more than seventeen years ago, escapes Devil's Island with Marcel (Henry B. Walthall), a scientist who is trying to create a formula to reduce people to one-sixth of their original size. The intended purpose of the formula is to make the Earth's limited resources last longer for an ever-growing population. The scientist dies after their escape.

Lavond joins the scientist's widow, Malita (Rafaela Ottiano), and decides to use the shrinking technique to obtain revenge on the three former business associates who had framed him and to vindicate himself. He returns to Paris and disguises himself as an old woman who sells lifelike dolls. He shrinks a young girl and one of his former associates to infiltrate the homes of the other two former associates, paralyzing one.

When the final associate confesses before he is attacked, Lavond clears his name and secures the future happiness of his estranged daughter, Lorraine (O'Sullivan), in the process. Malita isn't satisfied, and wants to continue to use the formula to carry on her husband's work. She tries to kill Paul when he announces that he is finished with their partnership, having accomplished all he intended, but she blows up their lab, killing herself.

Paul tells Toto, Lorraine's fiancé, about what happened. He meets his daughter, pretending to be the deceased Marcel. He tells Lorraine that Paul Lavond died during their escape from prison, but that he loved her very much. Lavond then departs, to an uncertain fate.

Cast
 Lionel Barrymore as Paul Lavond 
 Maureen O'Sullivan as Lorraine Lavond 
 Frank Lawton as Toto 
 Rafaela Ottiano as Malita 
 Robert Greig as Emil Coulvet 
 Lucy Beaumont as Madame Lavond 
 Henry B. Walthall as Marcel 
 Grace Ford as Lachna 
 Pedro de Cordoba as Charles Matin 
 Arthur Hohl as Victor Radin 
 Juanita Quigley as Marguerite Coulvet 
 Claire Du Brey as Madame Coulvet (as Claire du Brey) 
 Rollo Lloyd as Detective Maurice
 Frank Reicher as Doctor (uncredited)

Reception
Marketed as a novelty thriller, The Devil-Doll was not a financial success, although it did receive some praise from critics. The New York Times gave the film a positive review, making special note of its entertaining use of special effects, comparing it favorably to such films as King Kong and The Invisible Man.
However, a review in the American science fiction magazine Thrilling Wonder Stories was not as enthusiastic, calling the film a "disappointment" and a "run-of-the-mill thriller which does not attempt to recapture the unique fantasy of Merritt's novel."

See also
 List of films featuring miniature people
 Lionel Barrymore filmography

References

External links

 
 
 
 

Films about size change
1936 horror films
1936 films
1930s LGBT-related films
1930s science fiction horror films
American science fiction horror films
American black-and-white films
Cross-dressing in American films
Films scored by Franz Waxman
Films directed by Tod Browning
Films based on American horror novels
Metro-Goldwyn-Mayer films
Articles containing video clips
1930s English-language films
Films with screenplays by Garrett Fort
Films set on Devil's Island
Films set in Paris
Films about prison escapes
Overpopulation fiction
American films about revenge
1930s American films